The Mountain was a political group during the French Revolution. Its members, called the Montagnards, sat on the highest benches in the National Convention.

They were the most radical group and opposed the Girondins. The term, first used during a session of the Legislative Assembly, came into general use in 1793. By the summer of 1793, that pair of opposed minority groups divided the National Convention. That year, the Montagnards were influential in what is commonly known as the Reign of Terror.

The Mountain was composed mainly of members of the middle class, but represented the constituencies of Paris. As such, the Mountain was sensitive to the motivations of the city and responded strongly to demands from the working class sans-culottes. The Mountain operated on the belief that what was best for Paris would be best for all of France. Although they attempted some rural land reform, most of it was never enacted and they generally focused on the needs of the urban poor over that of rural France.

The Girondins were a moderate political faction created during the Legislative Assembly period. They were the political opponents of the more radical representatives within the Mountain. The Girondins had wanted to avoid the execution of Louis XVI and supported a constitution which would have allowed a popular vote to overturn legislation. The Mountain accused the Girondins of plotting against Paris because this caveat within the proposed constitution would have allowed rural areas of France to vote against legislation that benefits Paris, the main constituency of the Mountain. However, the real discord in the Convention occurred not between the Mountain and the Gironde, but between the aggressive antics of the minority of the Mountain and the rest of the Convention.

The Mountain was not unified as a party and relied on leaders like Maximilien Robespierre, Georges Danton and Jacques Hébert, who themselves came to represent different factions. Hébert, a journalist, gained a following as a radical patriot Montagnard (members who identified with him became known as the Hébertists) while Danton led a more moderate faction of the Mountain (followers came to be known as Dantonists). Regardless of the divisions, the nightly sessions of the Jacobin club, which met in the rue Saint-Honoré, can be considered to be a type of caucus for the Mountain. In June 1793, the Mountain successfully ousted most of the moderate Gironde members of the Convention with the assistance of radical sans-culottes.

Following their coup, the Mountain, led by Hérault de Séchelles, quickly began construction on a new constitution which was completed eight days later. The Committee of Public Safety reported the constitution to the Convention on 10 June and a final draft was adopted on 24 June. The process occurred quickly because as Robespierre, a prominent member of the Mountain, announced on 10 June the "good citizens demanded a constitution" and the "Constitution will be the reply of patriotic deputies, for it is the work of the Mountain". However, this constitution was never actually enacted. The Constitution of 1793 was delayed due to the situation in the war, and due to the Thermidorian Reaction that purged much of the government, it was eventually abandoned.

History

Origins
It is difficult to pinpoint the conception of the Montagnard group because the lines which defined it were themselves quite nebulous early on. Originally, members of The Mountain were the men who sat in the highest rows of the Jacobin Clubs, loosely organized political debate clubs open to the public. Though members of the Montagnards were known for their commitment to radical political resolutions prior to 1793, the contours of political groups presented an ever-evolving reality that shifted in response to events. Would-be prominent Montagnard leaders like Jean-Baptiste Robert Lindet and Jean Bon Saint-André were tempted by early Girondin proposals and soon many moderates—even anti-radicals—felt the need to push for radical endeavors in light of threats both within and without the country. It was only after the trial of Louis XVI in December 1792, which united the Montagnards on a position of regicide, that the ideals and power of the group fully consolidated.

Rise and terror
The rise of Montagnards corresponds to the fall of the Girondins. The Girondins hesitated on the correct course of action to take with Louis XVI after his attempt to flee France on 20 June 1791. Some of the Girondins believed they could use the king as figurehead. While the Girondins hesitated, the Montagnards took a united stand during the trial in December 1792–January 1793 and favored the king's execution.

Riding on this victory, the Montagnards then sought to discredit the Girondins. They used tactics previously employed by the Girondins to denounce them as liars and enemies of the Revolution. They also formed a legislative committee in which Nicolas Hentz proposed a limitation of inheritances, gaining more support for the Montagnards. Girondin members were subsequently banned from the Jacobin club and excluded from the National Convention on 31 May2 June 1793.

Policies of the Mountain
Through attempted land redistribution policies, the Mountain showed some support for the rural poor. In August 1793, Montagnard member Jean Jacques Régis de Cambacérès drafted a piece of legislation which dealt with agricultural reform; in particular, he urged "relief from rent following harvest loss, compensation for improvements and fixity of tenure". This was in part to combat restlessness of share-croppers in the southwest. This draft never made it into law, but the drastic reforms suggest the Mountain's awareness of the need to please their base of support, both the rural and urban poor.

Other policies aimed at supporting the poor included price controls enacted by the Mountain in 1793. This law, called the General Maximum, was supported by a group of agitators within the Mountain known as the Enragés. It fixed prices and wages throughout France. At the same time, bread prices were rising as the commodity became scarce, and in an initiative spearheaded by Collot d'Herbois and Billaud-Varenne, a law was enacted in July 1793 that forbade the hoarding of "daily necessities". The hoarding of grain became a crime punishable by death.

Other economic policies enacted by the Mountain included an embargo on the export of French goods. As a result of this embargo, France was essentially unable to trade with foreign markets and the import of goods effectively ended. In theory, this protected French markets from foreign goods and required French people to support French goods. In addition to the embargo against foreign goods, Act 1651, passed by the Mountain in October 1793, further isolated France from the rest of Europe by forbidding any foreign vessels from trading along the French coast.

The Mountain also enacted policies restricting and granting religious freedom. These policies varied but began with a ban on religion, allowing only for "the worship of Reason" in 1793 and progressing to religious freedom with the separation of Church and State in 1795.

Decline and fall
The fall and exclusion of the Montagnards from the National Convention began with the collapse of the Revolution's radical phase and the death of Robespierre on 10 Thermidor (28 July 1794). While the Montagnards celebrated unity, there was growing heterogeneity within the group as Robespierre and his Committee of Public Safety overextended themselves with their tight control over the military and their extreme opposition to corruption in the government. Their overextension drew the ire of other revolutionary leaders and a number of plots coalesced on 9 Thermidor (Thermidorian Reaction) when collaborators with the more moderate group the Dantonists acted in response to fears that Robespierre planned to execute them.

The purge of Robespierre was strongly similar to previous measures employed by the Montagnards to expel factions, such as the Girondins. However, as Robespierre was widely considered the heart of the Montagnards, his death symbolized their collapse. Few desired to take on the name of Montagnards afterwards, leaving around only about 100 men. Finally, at the end of 1794 the Mountain largely devolved into a group called The Crest, which lacked any real power.

Factions and prominent members
The Mountain was born in 1792, with the merger of two prominent left-wing clubs: the Jacobins and Cordeliers. The Jacobins were initially moderate republicans and the Cordeliers were radical populist. In late 1792, Danton and his supporters wanted a reconciliation with the Girondins, which caused a break with Robespierre. After the trial of Girondins in 1793, Danton became strongly moderate while Robespierre continued his authoritarian policies.

The moderates of Danton were also rival to the followers of Jacques Hébert who wanted the persecution of all non-Montagnards and the dechristianisation of France. When Robespierre eliminated first the Hébertists (March 1794) and then the Dantonistes (April 1794), his group ruled The Mountain. This was until the Thermidorian Reaction, when several conspirators supported by The Plain instituted a coup d'état. They executed Robespierre and his supporters and split from The Mountain to form the Thermidorian Left. The Montagnards that survived were arrested, executed or deported. By 1795 the Mountain had effectively been obliterated.

 Robespierrists
 Maximilien Robespierre
 Louis Antoine de Saint-Just
 Georges Couthon
 Marie-Jean Hérault de Séchelles
 Pierre-François-Joseph Robert
 Paul Barras
 Joseph Fouché
 Augustin Robespierre
 Jacques-Louis David
 Bertrand Barère
 Pierre Choderlos de Laclos
 Jacques Nicolas Billaud-Varenne
 Jean-Lambert Tallien
 Louis-Michel le Peletier
 François Hanriot
 Jean-Baptiste de Lavalette
 Jean-Baptiste Fleuriot-Lescot
 Antoine Simon
 René Levasseur
 Gilbert Romme
 Jean-Marie Claude Alexandre Goujon
 Félix Lepeletier
 Claude-François de Payan
 François Nicolas Anthoine
 Jeanbon Saint-André
 Marc-Antoine Jullien de Paris
 Marc-Antoine Jullien

 Hébertists
 Jacques Hébert
 Pierre Gaspard Chaumette
 Jean-Paul Marat (supporter)
 Jean-Baptiste-Joseph Gobel
 Anacharsis Cloots
 François Chabot
 Jean Baptiste Noël Bouchotte
 Stanislas-Marie Maillard
 François-Nicolas Vincent
 Antoine-François Momoro
 Charles-Philippe Ronsin
 Joseph Le Bon
 Jean-Baptiste Carrier
 Jean-Nicolas Pache (Formerly a Girondin)
 Claude Javogues

 Indulgents
 Georges Danton
 Camille Desmoulins (Formerly a Robespierrist)
 Fabre d'Églantine
 Julien of Toulouse
 François Louis Bourdon
 Louis Legendre
 Antoine Marie Charles Garnier
 Antoine Christophe Merlin
 Louis-Marie Stanislas Fréron
 Pierre Philippeaux
 François Joseph Westermann
 Edme-Bonaventure Courtois
 Jacques-Alexis Thuriot de la Rosière

 Independent Montagnards
 Pierre Joseph Cambon
 Edmond Louis Alexis Dubois-Crancé
 Jean Francois Rewbell
 Lazare Carnot (Formerly a Plain)
 Philippe-Antoine Merlin de Douai (Formerly a Plain)
 Henri Grégoire (Formerly a Plain)
 Pierre Louis Prieur
 Claude-Antoine Prieur-Duvernois (Formerly a Plain)
 Elie Lacoste
 Marc-Guillaume Alexis Vadier
 Armand-Joseph Guffroy (Formerly a Robespierrist)
 Claude Basire
 Francois Chabot

Electoral results

See also
 Anti-clericalism
 Left-wing populism
 Liberalism and radicalism in France
 Republicanism
 Socialism in France
 The Mountain (1849)

References

Bibliography
 François Furet and Mona Ozouf. A Critical Dictionary of the French Revolution. (Belknap Press, 1989).
 Jeremy D. Popkin, A Short History of the French Revolution, 5th ed. (Pearson, 2009).
 Marisa Linton, Choosing Terror: Virtue, Friendship, and Authenticity in the French Revolution. (Oxford University Press, 2013).
 Morris Slavin. The Making of an Insurrection: Parisian Sections and the Gironde. (Harvard University Press, 1986).
 Peter Kropotkin, Trans. N. F. Dryhurst The Great French Revolution, 1789–1793. (New York: Vanguard Printings, 1927).
 Peter McPhee, Robespierre: A Revolutionary Life. (Yale University Press, 2012).
 Robert J. Alderson, This Bright Era of Happy Revolutions: French Consul Michel-Ange-Bernard Mangourit and International Republicanism in Charleston, 1792-1794. (University of South Carolina Press, 2008).
 Voerman, Jan, The Reign of Terror. (Andrews University Press, 2009).
 "Mountain (the Mountain)". Collins English Dictionary Online. Retrieved 24 May 2014.
 "Montagnard (French history)". Encyclopædia Britannica Online. Retrieved 8 May 2014.

Further reading 

 
 
 Jordan, David P. (1983). The Jacobins and Their Victims in The Eighteenth Century. University of Pennsylvania. p. 268. .
 Palmer, R.R. (2005). Twelve Who Ruled: The Year of the Terror in the French Revolution. Princeton University Press. .
 Popkin, Jeremy D. (2014). A Short History of the French Revolution. 6th Edition. Pearson Higher Education. .

Montagnards
1793 establishments in France
1795 disestablishments in France
Abolitionist organizations
French National Convention
Groups of the French Revolution
Jacobinism
Left-wing parties in France
Left-wing populism in France
Political parties established in 1793
Political parties disestablished in 1795
Radical parties in France